Ben C. Eastman (October 24, 1812 – February 2, 1856) was an American lawyer and politician who represented Wisconsin's 2nd congressional district in the United States House of Representatives in the Thirty-second and Thirty-third Congresses.

Biography

Born in Strong in Massachusetts' District of Maine, Eastman attended the public schools. He studied law. He was admitted to the bar in 1840 and practiced in Green Bay, Wisconsin Territory. He moved to Platteville, the same year and continued the practice of law and then served as secretary of the legislative council of Wisconsin Territory 1843–1846. He served one term on the Board of Supervisors of Grant County.

In 1850, Eastman ran for Congress on the Democratic ticket in the 2nd District, which, in 1850, covered a wide swath of western Wisconsin.  He defeated Whig incumbent Orsamus Cole, and went on to serve in the thirty-second Congress.  He was re-elected in 1852.  He declined to be a candidate for renomination in 1854, and resumed the practice of law.

He died in Platteville on February 2, 1856 after an illness of several weeks, He was interred in Forest Hill Cemetery in Madison, Wisconsin.

Sources

1812 births
1856 deaths
People from Strong, Maine
People from Platteville, Wisconsin
Wisconsin Territory officials
District attorneys in Wisconsin
Democratic Party members of the United States House of Representatives from Wisconsin
19th-century American politicians